Carlotta Nwajide (born 12 July 1995) is a German rower. She competed in the women's quadruple sculls event at the 2020 Summer Olympics.

References

External links
 

1995 births
Living people
German female rowers
Olympic rowers of Germany
Rowers at the 2020 Summer Olympics
Place of birth missing (living people)